Hsieh Su-wei and Peng Shuai were the defending champions, but chose not to compete.

Cara Black and Liezel Huber won in the final, 6–1, 3–6, 10–3, against Tathiana Garbin and Nadia Petrova.

Seeds

  Cara Black /  Liezel Huber (champions)
  Lisa Raymond /  Rennae Stubbs (first round)
  Alisa Kleybanova /  Francesca Schiavone (second round)
  Anna-Lena Grönefeld /  Vania King (semifinals)

Main draw

Draw

External links
Main Draw Doubles

W